Ryan C. Shealy (December 9, 1923 – March 5, 2001) was an American politician from South Carolina.

Born in Leesville, South Carolina, Shealy served in the United States Navy during World War II. Shealy served in the South Carolina House of Representatives from 1954 to 1970 and the South Carolina Senate from 1980 to 1992.

EXTERNAL LINKS

Notes

Members of the South Carolina House of Representatives
South Carolina state senators
1923 births
2001 deaths
United States Navy personnel of World War II
20th-century American politicians
People from Batesburg-Leesville, South Carolina
Military personnel from South Carolina